Carla Werden Overbeck (born May 9, 1968) is a retired American soccer player and longtime member and captain of the United States women's national soccer team. She is currently an assistant coach of Duke University's women's soccer team, where she has been coaching since 1992, overseeing Duke's defensive unit principally. She was inducted into the National Soccer Hall of Fame in 2006.

Playing career

Youth
Overbeck began playing soccer at the age of 11, playing for club soccer team the Dallas Sting. With the Sting, she won two national championships.

College
Overbeck played college soccer at the University of North Carolina at Chapel Hill from 1986 to 1989, where she won the NCAA Women's Soccer Championship each of her four seasons. She was an NSCAA All-America selection three times. During her time as a central defender with the Tar Heels, the team tallied a 95-match unbeaten streak (89–0–6).

Overbeck was a four-time member of the NCAA All-Tournament Team and a two-time All-ACC selection. In addition, she was a member of the 1986 Soccer America All-America Freshman Team and was the Most Valuable Defensive Player of the 1988 NCAA Tournament.

On May 6, 2006, Overbeck was elected to the National Soccer Hall of Fame and was a 2010 North Carolina Sports Hall of Fame inductee.

Club
Overbeck played for the Raleigh Wings of the W-League in 1998 and helped the team finish with a 14–0 record and clinch the league's championship title.

From 2001 to 2003, Overbeck played for the Carolina Courage in the WUSA, the first professional soccer league for women in the United States. She was also on the WUSA Board of Governors.  In August 2002, her overtime goal in the semifinal match helped lift the Courage to the WUSA Founders Cup II, the league's championship game against the Washington Freedom, led by Mia Hamm and Abby Wambach. The Courage defeated the Freedom 3–2 to clinch the championship title on August 24, 2002.

International
Overbeck first appeared with the U.S. national team on June 1, 1988, and was a member of the U.S. team that won the first-ever FIFA Women's World Cup in 1991. Playing central defender, she led a defense that allowed five goals in six matches.

She was one of two players to play every minute of each of the team's games at the 1995 FIFA Women's World Cup, the 1996 Summer Olympics, and the 1999 Women's World Cup. In 1998, she captained the national team to win the first-ever Goodwill Games.

Overbeck retired from international competition following the 2000 Summer Olympics, finishing her career with 168 caps.

Coaching career

Overbeck has been an assistant coach for Duke University's women's soccer team since 1992.

Media coverage
Overbeck appeared with her national team teammates on the cover of Sports Illustrateds December 20, 1999 issue. She was featured in the film Dare to Dream: The Story of the U.S. Women's Soccer Team in 2007.

Overbeck was featured in the ESPN series Nine for IX in "The 99ers" episode.

Personal life
Born in Pasadena, California, Overbeck grew up in Richardson, Texas, a suburb of Dallas, where she attended Richardson High School. She graduated from the University of North Carolina at Chapel Hill with a degree in psychology in 1990. In late 1999, Overbeck was diagnosed with Graves' disease. In December 2009, she became an official spokesperson for Instaflex. She and her husband, Greg Overbeck, have one son, Jackson, and a daughter, Carson Elizabeth.

Honors and awards

Individual
 National Soccer Hall of Fame inductee, 2006
 North Carolina Sports Hall of Fame inductee, 2010

Team
 Sports Illustrated Sportswomen of the Year, December 1999
 WUSA Founders Cup II, 2002

See also

 List of University of North Carolina at Chapel Hill Olympians
 List of Olympic medalists in football
 List of 1996 Summer Olympics medal winners
 List of 2000 Summer Olympics medal winners
 List of members of the North Carolina Sports Hall of Fame

References

External links
 
 Duke coach profile
 Profile at soccertimes.com
 Profile at WUSA

1968 births
Living people
United States women's international soccer players
Women's association football central defenders
National Soccer Hall of Fame members
North Carolina Tar Heels women's soccer players
Olympic gold medalists for the United States in soccer
Olympic silver medalists for the United States in soccer
Footballers at the 1996 Summer Olympics
Footballers at the 2000 Summer Olympics
Women's United Soccer Association players
Carolina Courage players
FIFA Century Club
1991 FIFA Women's World Cup players
1995 FIFA Women's World Cup players
1999 FIFA Women's World Cup players
FIFA Women's World Cup-winning players
FIFA Women's World Cup-winning captains
Medalists at the 2000 Summer Olympics
Medalists at the 1996 Summer Olympics
American women's soccer players
Competitors at the 1998 Goodwill Games
Raleigh Wings players
USL W-League (1995–2015) players